This is a list of earthquakes in 1954. Only magnitude 6.0 or greater earthquakes appear on the list. Lower magnitude events are included if they have caused death, injury or damage. Events which occurred in remote areas will be excluded from the list as they wouldn't have generated significant media interest. All dates are listed according to UTC time. The year was characterized by a lack of large events. The largest event of magnitude 7.8 occurred in Spain, albeit a rare event for the area, there were no deaths due to its depth. A significant quake struck Nevada in December. With a magnitude of 7.3, this was one of the largest in the state's history. Total lives lost in the year amounted to 1,295. The vast majority of these came from Algeria, which suffered one of its worst disasters in September.

Overall

By death toll 

 Note: At least 10 casualties

By magnitude 

 Note: At least 7.0 magnitude

Notable events

January

February

March

April

May

June

July

August

September

October

November

December

References

1954
 
1954